Sedation is the reduction of irritability or agitation by administration of sedative drugs, generally to facilitate a medical procedure or diagnostic procedure. Examples of drugs which can be used for sedation include isoflurane, diethyl ether, propofol, etomidate, ketamine, pentobarbital, lorazepam and midazolam.

Medical uses
Sedation is typically used in minor surgical procedures such as endoscopy, vasectomy, or dentistry and for reconstructive surgery, some cosmetic surgeries, removal of wisdom teeth, or for high-anxiety patients. Sedation methods in dentistry include inhalation sedation (using nitrous oxide), oral sedation, and intravenous (IV) sedation. Inhalation sedation is also sometimes referred to as relative analgesia.

Sedation is also used extensively in the intensive care unit so that patients who are being ventilated tolerate having an endotracheal tube in their trachea. It can also be used during a long term brain EEG to help patient relax.

Risks
There are studies claiming that sedation accounts for 40 percent to 50 percent procedure-related complications. Airway obstruction, apnea
and hypotension are not uncommon during sedation and require the presence of health professionals who are suitably trained to detect and manage these problems. Aside from the suppression of respiration, risks also include unintended levels of sedation, postoperative somnolence, aspiration, and adverse reactions to sedation medications. Complications could also include perforation, bleeding, and the stimulation of vasovagal reflexes. To avoid sedation risks, care providers conduct a thorough pre-sedation evaluation and this process includes pre-sedation history and physicals with emphasis on the determining characteristics that indicate potential risks to the patient and potential difficult airway management. This process can also reveal if the sedation period needs to be prolonged or additional therapeutic procedures are required.

Levels of sedation
Sedation scales are used in medical situations in conjunction with a medical history in assessing the applicable degree of sedation in patients in order to avoid under-sedation (the patient risks experiencing pain or distress) and over-sedation (the patient risks side effects such as suppression of breathing, which might lead to death).

Examples of sedation scales include MSAT (Minnesota Sedation Assessment Tool), UMSS (University of Michigan Sedation Scale), the Ramsay Scale (Ramsay, et al. 1974) and the RASS (Richmond Agitation-Sedation Scale).

The American Society of Anesthesiologists defines the continuum of sedation as follows:
 Minimal sedation – normal response to verbal stimuli.
 Moderate sedation – purposeful response to verbal/tactile stimulation. (This is usually referred to as "conscious sedation")
 Deep sedation – purposeful response to repeated or painful stimulation.
 General anesthesia – unarousable even with painful stimulus.

In the United Kingdom, deep sedation is considered to be a part of the spectrum of general anesthesia, as opposed to conscious sedation.

In addition to the aforementioned precautions, patients should be interviewed to determine if they have any other condition that may lead to complications while undergoing treatment. Any head, neck, or spinal cord injuries should be noted as well as any diagnosis of osteoporosis.

Intravenous sedation 
The most common standard conscious sedation technique for adults is intravenous sedation using Midazolam. This requires a needle to be put into a vein to deliver the medication; this is known as an IV cannula.

Indications:
 Reduced dental anxiety and phobia
 Traumatic or prolonged dental procedures
 Patients with gag reflex
 Medical conditions potentially aggravated by the stress of dental treatment
 Special care (mild intellectual or physical disability)
 Some disorders involving its spasticity due to its muscle relaxant properties

Contraindications:
 Uncooperative patient
 Psychologically immature individuals
 Patients unable to provide a suitable escort
 Difficult oral surgery or prolonged surgical procedure
 Muscle diseases or diseases which cause muscle wastage
 ASA III or above
 Allergy or hypersensitivity to benzodiazepines
 Pregnancy and breast feeding
 History of psychiatric disorders
 Kidney or liver dysfunction
 Acute pulmonary insufficiency
 Preexisting respiratory conditions as patients are susceptible to respiratory depression
 Alcohol or drug addiction
 Lack of visible superficial veins
 CNS depressant medications which can alter reaction to sedation

See also

 Palliative sedation
 Procedural sedation
 Twilight anesthesia
 Inhalation sedation
 Sedoanalgesia

References

Anesthesia